Ondarroa is a town and municipality located in the province of Biscay, in the autonomous community of the Basque Autonomous Community, northern Spain.

Main sights
Church of St. Mary, in late Gothic style (late 15th century) 
Likona Tower, a typical Basque tower-house.
Itsas Aurre Bridge, designed by Santiago Calatrava

People
Pedro Maria Unanue (1814-1846)
Txomin Agirre (1864-1920)
Agustin Zubikarai (1914-2004)
Karmele Urresti Iturrioz (1916-2010)
Dina Bilbao (1960-1997) - athlete
Ana Urkiza (b. 1969) - writer
Kirmen Uribe (b. 1970) - writer
Kepa Arrizabalaga (b. 1994) - goalkeeper for Chelsea and Spain, previously of Athletic Bilbao

Twin towns
 Santa Flavia, Italy
 Borj, Western Sahara

References

External links
ONDARROA in the Bernardo Estornés Lasa - Auñamendi Encyclopedia (Euskomedia Fundazioa) 
Ondarroa Town Hall 

Municipalities in Biscay
Fishing communities
Populated coastal places in Spain